Hervé Flandin (born 4 June 1965 in Modane) is a former French biathlete. At the 1994 Winter Olympics in Lillehammer, he won a bronze medal with the French relay team, in 4 × 7.5 km relay.

References

1965 births
Living people
French male biathletes
Olympic biathletes of France
Biathletes at the 1988 Winter Olympics
Biathletes at the 1992 Winter Olympics
Biathletes at the 1994 Winter Olympics
Olympic bronze medalists for France
Olympic medalists in biathlon
Biathlon World Championships medalists
Medalists at the 1994 Winter Olympics
20th-century French people